Lepidotrigla argus, the long-finned sea gurnard or eye gurnard, is a species of marine, demersal ray-finned fish from the family Triglidae, the gurnards and sea robins. It is found in the Indo-West Pacific Ocean.

Taxonomy
Lepidotrigla argus was first formally described in 1910 by the Irish born Australian herpetologist and ichthyologist James Douglas Ogilby with its type localities given as between South Hill and Cape Gloucester in Queensland and Cape Bryon in New South Wales. The specific name argus refers to Argus, the mythical hundred-eyed giant who was the guardian of Io, after his death his many eyes were changed into the feathers of a peacock, thought to be a reference to the vivid red or orange spot on the first dorsal fin.

Description
There is a bright red or orange spot on the first dorsal fin.

Distribution and habitat
Lepidotrigla argus is endemic to Australia where it is found from the Houtman Abrolhos Islands to Rowley Shoals in Western Australia and from Cape York south to off Disaster Bay, New South Wales, and has been reported from Papua New Guinea.

Biology
Studies on the gonads of captured fishes suggested that long-fiined gurnards spawn in all months, however the recruitment of new individuals into the population occurs periodically.

References

argus
Fish of the Pacific Ocean
Fish described in 1910
Taxa named by James Douglas Ogilby